Frank & Ellen Remai Arts Centre is a performing arts centre in the River Landing area of Saskatoon, Saskatchewan, Canada. The centre is owned by and the main venue for the Persephone Theatre. Constructed in 2007 at a cost of $11 Million Canadian, the main theatre seats 450, with a second smaller 100-seat theatre and other supporting facilities and workshops that make up the centre.

The Remai Modern art gallery is adjacent and connected to the Remai Arts Centre. Both facilities share an underground parking garage.

References

External links
 

Buildings and structures in Saskatoon
Music venues in Saskatchewan
Theatres in Saskatchewan
Performing arts centres in Canada
Tourist attractions in Saskatoon
Theatres completed in 2007
2007 establishments in Saskatchewan